Hearing is the sense by which sound is perceived.

Hearing or The Hearing may also refer to:

 Hearing (law), a legal proceeding before a court or other decision-making body or officer
 Preliminary hearing
 United States congressional hearing
 Hearing (person), a person who has hearing within normal parameters
 Hearing loss
 "The Hearing" (Dynasty 1982), a television episode
 "The Hearing" (Dynasty 1983), a two-part television episode

See also
 Hear (disambiguation)
 Occasional hearing